Abd al-Fattah Fumani was a 17th century Persian historian from Fuman in Gilan, who wrote a history of his native province, the Tarikh-i Gilan.

Sources 
 
 

16th-century births
17th-century deaths
17th-century Iranian historians
People from Gilan Province
Safavid historians
Gilaki people
17th-century writers of Safavid Iran